Jason Paul Queally  (born 11 May 1970) is an English track cyclist. He won a gold medal at the 2000 Olympics in Sydney.

Early years

Born at Great Heywood, Staffordshire, Queally spent his childhood in Caton, a village near Lancaster. He attended Caton County Primary School and Lancaster Royal Grammar School, where he was part of the swimming squad in the mid-1980s, later representing Lancaster and British Universities in water polo while a student at Lancaster University, where he earned a BSc in Biological Science. He took up cycle-racing at 25.

In 1996, he nearly died in an accident at Meadowbank cycling track in Edinburgh (Chris Hoy brought down all the riders behind him, having caught the wheel of Craig MacLean) when an 18-inch sliver of the wooden track entered his chest via his armpit. The accident seriously affected Queally's confidence in tactical racing; as a result, he no longer took part in the sprint events, instead choosing to dedicate himself to Kilo and team sprint riding, time trial events with a reduced risk of crashing.

Post Sydney

In October 2001 Queally competed in the World Human Powered Speed Challenge at Battle Mountain, Nevada on the Blueyonder recumbent bicycle, built largely from carbon fibre by Reynard Motorsport to a design by Chris Field. Queally maintained  over the 200m timed section of the course, a European record. The winner, Sam Whittingham, achieved .

Although Olympic champion, Queally was not selected for the 1 km time trial at the 2004 Summer Olympics, competing only in the team sprint, in which Great Britain team was eliminated in the first round by Germany, the eventual winner, despite posting the second fastest time of the competition.

In 2009, Queally was inducted into the British Cycling Hall of Fame.

Queally retired from able-bodied cycling after failing to qualify for the 2008 Summer Olympics. He subsequently worked with Paralympic cyclist Anthony Kappes with the aim of competing together on a tandem at the 2012 Summer Paralympics. However he returned to able-bodied competition when he received a call up to the British squad for the 2010 UCI Track Cycling World Championships. After not being selected for the 2012 Summer Olympics he rejoined the British paralympic cycling squad as a pilot for the tandem events in November 2012.

Medals in championships
Olympic Games
2000 
Gold,  1km time trial
Silver,  team sprint
World Championships
2005
Gold, team sprint
Silver, 1 km time trial
2004
Bronze, team sprint
2003
Bronze, team sprint
2001
Bronze, team sprint
2000
Silver, team sprint
Bronze, 1 km time trial
1999
Silver, team sprint
Commonwealth Games
2006
Silver, 1 km time trial
Silver, team sprint
2002
Silver, 1 km time trial
Silver, team sprint
1998
Silver, 1 km time trial

See also
City of Edinburgh Racing Club
Achievements of members of City of Edinburgh Racing Club

References

External links

BBC News Online report of Queally's Olympic gold win

1970 births
Living people
English male cyclists
Commonwealth Games silver medallists for England
Cyclists at the 1998 Commonwealth Games
Cyclists at the 2000 Summer Olympics
Cyclists at the 2002 Commonwealth Games
Cyclists at the 2004 Summer Olympics
Cyclists at the 2006 Commonwealth Games
Olympic cyclists of Great Britain
English Olympic medallists
Olympic gold medallists for Great Britain
English people of Irish descent
Alumni of Lancaster University
Alumni of Bowland College, Lancaster
People educated at Lancaster Royal Grammar School
Sportspeople from Chorley
Sportspeople from Staffordshire
Olympic medalists in cycling
UCI Track Cycling World Champions (men)
Medalists at the 2000 Summer Olympics
Commonwealth Games medallists in cycling
English track cyclists
Olympic silver medallists for Great Britain
Medallists at the 1998 Commonwealth Games
Medallists at the 2002 Commonwealth Games
Medallists at the 2006 Commonwealth Games